Li Huayun is a Chinese football forward who played for China in the 1984 Asian Cup. He also played for Liaoning.

Career statistics

International statistics

External links
Team China Stats

1963 births
Living people
Association football forwards
Chinese footballers
China international footballers
1984 AFC Asian Cup players